Howard Moltz (1927-2004) was an American developmental biopsychologist who was a professor of psychology at the University of Chicago. Much of his earlier research focused on imprinting and maternal behavior in rats, but later in his career, he shifted to using positron emission tomography to research sexual behavior in humans. He was a fellow of the American Association for the Advancement of Science and served as president of the International Society for Developmental Psychobiology. Shortly after his death in 2004, the Illinois General Assembly passed a resolution in his honor.

References

American developmental psychologists
1927 births
2004 deaths
University of Chicago faculty
Fellows of the American Association for the Advancement of Science
Scientists from New York City
New York University alumni
Brooklyn College faculty